Shane Veryzer (born 24 September 1985) is an Australian professional wrestler, who is currently working for New Japan Pro-Wrestling (NJPW) under the ring name Shane Haste as a member of The Mighty Don't Kneel. He is best known for his tenure in WWE, where he performed  under the ring names Shane Thorne and Slapjack.

He is also known for his work in Pro Wrestling Noah, where, as part of The Mighty Don't Kneel with partner Mikey Nicholls, he is a former two-time GHC Tag Team Champion. He also competed for Ring of Honor (ROH) and Pro Wrestling Guerrilla (PWG) in the United States. He signed with WWE in 2016 and was assigned to the NXT brand, where he was given the Shane Thorne ring name. In early 2020, Thorne debuted on Raw, and in August of that year was repackaged as Slapjack, a mask wearing member of Retribution. Following the stable's split, he reverted to his previous ring name and was moved to SmackDown. Despite this, he was only limited to dark matches and was released from the promotion in November 2021. He then began working for NJPW's American subsidary, where TMDK were reformed as a stable, with Jonah as the leader.

Early life 
Shane Veryzer was born on 24 September 1985 in Perth, Western Australia.

Professional wrestling career

Early career (2003–2011) 
Veryzer started training at the Dynamite Factory, the wrestling school of Explosive Pro Wrestling (EPW). His debut match took place at the Uprising event on 22 February 2003 in a four-way match under the Shane Haste ring name. He won the EPW Heavyweight Championship once and the EPW Tag Team Championship twice. After working all over the Australian continent, he moved to California, United States, and started working for independent wrestling promotions in the US, such as Pro Wrestling Guerrilla (PWG) and World League Wrestling (WLW).

Pro Wrestling Noah (2011–2016)

On 23 February 2011, Haste made his debut in Pro Wrestling Noah as he had a tryout match against his teammate Mikey Nicholls. A month after the try-out match, both men started to work full-time with the Japanese promotion.
On 7 July, Haste and Nicholls, known together as The Mighty Don't Kneel (TMDK), won the GHC Tag Team Championship after they defeated Toru Yano and Takashi Iizuka. At the end of 2013, the Tokyo Sports magazine named Haste and Nicholls the tag team of the year, making them the first foreign team to win the award since Stan Hansen and Vader in 1998. They lost the title to Maybach Taniguchi and Takeshi Morishima on 25 January 2014.

They regained the title from Dangan Yankies (Masato Tanaka and Takashi Sugiura) on 10 January 2015. They lost the title to K.E.S. (Davey Boy Smith Jr. and Lance Archer) on 11 February. On 28 December, Noah announced that Haste and Nicholls would leave the promotion following their contracts expiring at the end of the year. On 11 February 2016, Noah announced that Haste and Nicholls would return to the promotion the following month to take part in a five-show-long farewell tour, entitled "Departure to the World". Their final Noah match took place on 10 March and saw them defeat Naomichi Marufuji and Mitsuhiro Kitamiya.

Other promotions (2012–2016)
After starting out in Noah, Haste returned to the United States and compete on Ring of Honor (ROH) in February 2012. He and Nicholls won the Rise and Prove Tournament, defeating two other teams to qualify for a match against The Briscoe Brothers (Jay Briscoe and Mark Briscoe). At the Showdown in the Sun iPPV on 30 March, Haste and Nicholls lost to The Briscoe Brothers in a Proving Ground match.

Also in February 2012, Haste and Nicholls wrestled television matches for Championship Wrestling from Hollywood (CWFH). Also in March 2012, Haste and Nicholls started wrestling for Ohio Valley Wrestling (OVW), during their stint there, they were defeated in a title match for the OVW Southern Tag Team Championship by Jessie Godderz and Rudy Switchblade.

On 20 December 2014, Haste and Nicholls made their debut for New Japan Pro-Wrestling (NJPW), when they, along with Naomichi Marufuji, were revealed as Toru Yano's tag team partners at Wrestle Kingdom 9 on 4 January 2015. At the event, the four defeated Suzuki-gun (Davey Boy Smith Jr, Lance Archer, Shelton X Benjamin, and Takashi Iizuka) in an eight-man tag team match.

WWE

NXT (2016–2020) 
In June 2015, Haste and Nicholls took part in a WWE tryout camp. In February 2016, it was reported that Haste and Nicholls were scheduled to join WWE's NXT brand following their Noah farewell tour. On 25 March 2016, WWE confirmed the signings of both Haste and Nicholls, and they began training at the WWE Performance Center, while working for the promotion's developmental branch NXT. On 19 May, Haste and Nicholls were renamed Shane Thorne and Nick Miller, respectively, while TMDK was renamed TM-61. They debuted on 25 May episode of NXT, losing to Johnny Gargano and Tommaso Ciampa. In October, TM-61 entered the Dusty Rhodes Tag Team Classic tournament, in which they defeated Riddick Moss and Tino Sabbatelli in the first round, Austin Aries and Roderick Strong (Thorne defeated Strong in a singles match, due to Aries being unable to wrestle through injury) in the quarterfinals, and SAnitY in the semifinals. At NXT TakeOver: Toronto, TM-61 lost in the finals to The Authors of Pain. Thorne then had knee surgery in January 2017, which was expected to sideline him for seven to nine months. Thorne returned from injury on 14 September. TM-61 returned to television on 31 January 2018 episode of NXT, defeating The Ealy Brothers. TM-61 then entered the Dusty Rhodes Tag Team Classic tournament, being eliminated by The Authors of Pain in the first round. On 2 May episode of NXT, TM-61 defeated The Street Profits with a dirty pin, thus turning heel in the process. On 6 June episode of NXT, the team was renamed The Mighty. On 28 November episode of NXT, The Mighty lost to Oney Lorcan and Danny Burch in what would be their final match as a tag team. On 14 December, Miller was released from his WWE contract, disbanding the team.

On 22 January 2019, WWE announced that Thorne would be replacing Otis Dozovic in the Worlds Collide tournament. Thorne was eliminated in the first round by Adam Cole. Following this, Thorne would mainly wrestle at NXT live events for the next several months. Thorne would then return to television on 7 August episode of NXT, defeating Joaquin Wilde. On 11 September episode of NXT, Thorne would interrupt Johnny Gargano as he was cutting a promo to the crowd which resulted in Thorne getting super kicked by Gargano. The two faced off on 2 October episode with Gargano defeating Thorne.

Main roster (2020–2021) 

In March 2020, Thorne began appearing on Raw alongside his former TMDK stablemate Brendan Vink. On 27 April episode of Raw, Thorne and Vink became MVP's newest associates, as he challenged Cedric Alexander and Ricochet to a match the next week on their behalf. On 4 May episode of Raw, Thorne and Vink defeated Alexander and Ricochet, earning their first victory. However, their alliance with MVP ended after they were both traded back to NXT and Thorne and Vink would quietly disband as a team soon after.

On 21 September 2020 episode of Raw, Thorne was revealed as one of the main members of the Retribution faction, under the new ring name Slapjack. At the Hell in a Cell event, Slapjack challenged Bobby Lashley for the United States Championship, but lost. Retribution disbanded at the Fastlane Kickoff Show, where Reckoning and Slapjack walked out on leader Mustafa Ali, then T-Bar and Mace performed a double chokeslam on Ali after he lost a match for the WWE United States Championship to Riddle. On 9 April episode of SmackDown, Slapjack took part in the André the Giant Memorial Battle Royal but failed to win the match. Following this, Slapjack would be taken off television for several months. Following the split of Retribution, Veryzer would be quietly moved to SmackDown in April. He wrestled in a dark match after the 16 July episode of SmackDown under his original Shane Thorne name. He would wrestle two more dark matches in September with a loss to Keith Lee and a win over Austin Theory respectively. On 18 November 2021, Thorne was released from his WWE contract without ever reappearing on television.

New Japan Pro-Wrestling (2022–present) 
On the March 6, 2022 episode of NJPW Strong, Haste interfered in the tag team match between FinJuice (David Finlay and Juice Robinson) and the pairing of Jonah and Bad Dude Tito. He attacked Robinson while the referee was distracted, allowing Tito to hit a frog splash on Robinson for the win. This saw the reformation of TMDK, with Haste and Jonah tagging together (as Jonah was a member of the stable on the Australian independent scene). On the April 3 episode of NJPW Strong, Haste caused a disqualification loss to FinJuice after he struck Robinson with a steel chair. Robinson challenged TMDK and Tito to a Chicago Street Fight at Windy City Riot, alongside a mystery partner. At the event, TMDK and Tito were defeated by FinJuice and their partner, revealed to be Brody King. On May 14, at Capital Collision, Haste reunited with Mikey Nicholls, as TMDK defeated the United Empire. Haste and Nicholls then entered a tournament to become the inaugural Strong Openweight Tag Team Champions, but were defeated in the semi-final to the pairing of Christopher Daniels and Yuya Uemura.

Pro Wrestling Guerrilla (2022–present) 
On May 1, 2022, at Delivering the Goods, Haste was defeated by Jack Cartwheel; it was his first match in Pro Wrestling Guerrilla since 2009. On July 3, at Nineteen, Haste defeated Titus Alexander.

Other media 
As Shane Thorne, he made his video game debut as a playable character in WWE 2K18 and has since appeared in WWE 2K19 and WWE 2K20. He also appears in WWE 2K22 under his Slapjack persona.

Personal life 
Veryzer began dating actress Kimmy Jimenez, of the popular YouTube channel Smosh, in May 2020. The couple announced their engagement in February 2022 via Instagram.

Championships and accomplishments 
Explosive Pro Wrestling
EPW Heavyweight Championship (1 time)
EPW Tag Team Championship (2 times) – with Alex Kingston (1) and Mikey Nicholls (1)
ANZAC Day Cup (2009)
Invitational Trophy (2007)
Match of the Year (2009) with Alex Kingston vs. Chase Griffin and Dan Moore at Evolution
Most Improved Wrestler (2006)
Rookie of the Year (2003)
Wrestler of the Year (2007, 2008)
Pro Wrestling Illustrated
Ranked No. 147 of the top 500 singles wrestlers in the PWI 500 in 2016
Pro Wrestling Noah
GHC Tag Team Championship (2 times) – with Mikey Nicholls
Global Tag League Fighting Spirit Award (2015) – with Mikey Nicholls
Ring of Honor
Rise and Prove Tournament (2012) – with Mikey Nicholls
 Tokyo Sports
Best Tag Team Award (2013) – with Mikey Nicholls
Westside Pro Wrestling
International Impact Award (2011 co-winner, 2012)
Tag Team of the Year (2009) with Alex Kingston
Tag Team of the Year (2010) with Mikey Nicholls
The Grand Slam Club (2011)
 WrestleCrap
 Gooker Award (2020) –

References

External links 

 
 
 
 

1985 births
21st-century professional wrestlers
Living people
Australian male professional wrestlers
Sportspeople from Perth, Western Australia
Sportsmen from Western Australia
Expatriate professional wrestlers in Japan
Australian expatriate sportspeople in Japan
GHC Tag Team Champions